Mirko Müller (born 12 November 1974) is a German pair skater. His first partner was Jekatarina Silnitzkaja, and he later teamed up with Emilie Gras for a year.

Müller found his greatest success when Peggy Schwarz became his partner in 1996.  The pair went on to win three gold medals at the German Figure Skating Championships from 1998 to 2000.  After competing in the 1998 Winter Olympics, they captured the bronze medal at the World Figure Skating Championships that year.

Schwarz retired in 2000, and Müller found a new partner, Sarah Jentgens.  They captured the German national title in 2002.

Programs

With Jentgens

With Schwarz

Results
GP: Champions Series / Grand Prix

With Jentgens

With Schwarz

With Silnitzkaja

References

External links
 Official Homepage of Peggy Schwarz and Mirko Müller
 

1974 births
Living people
People from Löbau
German male pair skaters
Figure skaters at the 1998 Winter Olympics
Olympic figure skaters of Germany
World Figure Skating Championships medalists
Sportspeople from Saxony
20th-century German people
21st-century German people